The Basílica de los Santos Hermanos Mártires, Vicente, Sabina y Cristeta, best known as Basílica de San Vicente, is a church in Ávila, Spain. It is one of the best examples of Romanesque architecture in the country.

History
According to legend, Christian martyrs Vicente, Sabina and Cristeta were martyred during the rule of the Roman Emperor Diocletian; their corpses were buried into the rock and later a basilica was built over their tombs. In 1062 their remains were moved to the monastery of San Pedro de Arlanza in Burgos, but later, in 1175, they were returned to Ávila and the construction of a new basilica was started at the location. Construction was repeatedly halted or slowed, and were finished in the fourteenth century thanks to the support of Alfonso X and Sancho IV. The nave and aisles are  cross-vaulted.

The most notable aspect of the exterior are the decorated western and southern gates. In the interior, the most renowned attraction is the cenotaph of the titular martyrs, in polychrome stone. It is one of the best examples of Romanesque sculpture.

Description
The church is built using rock extracted from quarries of the nearby La Colilla. However, as in all the churches of Avila where this rock is described as sandstone, it is in fact decomposed granite. It is attributed to Giral Fruchel, the architect who introduced the Gothic style in Spain from France.

San Vicente is on the Latin cross plan, with a nave and two aisles ending in semicircular apses, with a large transept, ciborium, atrium and a crypt.

Conservation
The monastery is protected as part of a World Heritage Site, "Old Town of Avila and its extra muros churches"; it is listed as one of ten extra muros churches (that is, outside the walled city) included in the site.

References

Sources

External links
 English-language audioguide.

14th-century Roman Catholic church buildings in Spain
Bien de Interés Cultural landmarks in the Province of Ávila
Vicente
Romanesque architecture in Castile and León